Just Follow Law is a 2007 Singaporean comedy film directed by Jack Neo.

In the film, a blue-collar technician and the events and promotion department director swap souls after a freak accident at a fictional government agency Work Allocation Singapore (WAS). 
It was first released in Singapore on 15 February 2007.

Plot 

Lim Teng Zui is a single father, with a daughter, Xiao Mei, and works as a technician for a fictional statutory board known as WAS, with his assistants Bamboo, Blackjack, and their advisor Nancy. WAS holds a boardroom meeting led by CEO Alan Lui and directors Tanya Chew, Lau Chee Hong and Eric Tan. They discuss the planning of an event to welcome Chinese government officials led by Minister Seto and China's Minister of Manpower Chen to a visit to WAS. All departments are briefed, but Chew's arrogance leaves her crew unmotivated to prepare for the day.

A few days prior to the visit, Chew notices a huge clutter of junk in the office. Lim and the crew then decide to receiving a stern rebuke from the parking security guard Muthu in the process. Aware of the unsightly impression the rubbish creates, Lau tells Chew to conceal it, who in turn gets her crew to do so. Eventually Lim handles the matter by building a temporary wall held together by masking tape when they run out of nails. The plan falls apart as an end-of-visit photoshoot causes the wall to collapse from the excessive weight of people pressed against it, with Minister Seto himself falling into the junk pile.

In a cover up for the accident, a shocked Lui holds an impromptu boardroom meeting to investigate who is responsible for the construction of the temporary wall. Finger pointing lands the blame on Lim, with the committee docking his salary and bonus. An angry Lim confronts Chew in a car chase, resulting in a severe car accident when they both run off the flyover. Lim and Chew, having survived the accident, wake up in the hospital with their bodies swapped. Both are shortly transferred to a mental hospital before consulting a Chinese temple. After they are discharged, they are forced to experience living in each other's lives.

"Lim" learns of his poor living conditions and eventually discovers that Chew's mother, despite being well-fed, collects cans in her free time due to heavy estrangement from her daughter. Taking from Blackjack's advice to the latter to better spend her time on self-improvement, "Lim" takes on skill improvement courses to better provide for Xiao Mei and Chew's mother.

Meanwhile, "Chew"'s negligence and poor performance as a director causes the department to grossly overspend their budget. Lui plans to shut down the department in response. In an attempt to save it from closure, "Chew" and "Lim" plan a Job Fair Exhibition which, after a decision by the board, must operate with a small budget and scale.

Xiao Mei is hospitalized after a traffic accident, and "Lim" had to rely on "Chew"'s savings to pay for her medical bills, calling "Chew" out for neglecting his own daughter after being spoilt by his new lavish lifestyle. Back at the department, "Lim" and "Chew" learn that the Job Fair will take at least three months to organize, due to red tape and lack of information from various ministries. Despite various obstacles, the Job Fair is realized.

On the day of the Job Fair, planned procedures are sabotaged, including a dislodged stage backdrop. Lim boldly chooses to use masking tape to fix the backdrop due to the lack of time, despite the earlier fiasco. Obstacles are dealt with as they appear (including the use of fire extinguishers as a replacement for smoke effects), but a pyrotechnics accident during the final sing-along session causes a building fire. In the chaos, Minister Seto discovers the loose backdrop and dislodges it, providing an improvised exit route for the stage members to escape unharmed. "Chew" valiantly runs back into the burning building to save Xiao Mei, while "Lim" watches Chew's mother break down in tears out of concern for Chew, realising how much she loves her daughter. Lui attempts to claim credit for the loose backdrop, but was foiled by Tan telling the former to "cover up" due to his pants being burnt by the fire. Shortly after the incident, a Board of Inquiry investigation is conducted, with various personnel pushing around the blame of the fire and the various sabotages surrounding it.

"Lim" is awarded the National Creativity Award for inadvertently inventing a fire escape door during the fire. Two months later, WAS was shut down and their respective members go their separate ways. Lui is blacklisted due to his repeated mistakes and various cover ups. Blackjack and Bamboo are interviewed for positions in other companies, with the latter finding out Tiong is now his company's CEO, only to be rejected for his lack of skills.

"Lim" and "Chew" decide to reenact their accident in an attempt to reverse the swap and regain their original bodies. In the mid-credits scene, although the results of Lim and Chew's attempt remained ambiguous, they have gotten together and eventually married in order to retain each others' families, living together at Chew’s home along with her mother.

Cast

Production

Development and writing 

The development of Just Follow Law began when Jack Neo pitched the idea of Fann Wong during one of their backstage meetings, though they can't agree regarding the location of the agreement. It was inspired by the third and current Prime Minister of Singapore, Lee Hsien Loong's speech at the 2006 National Day Rally about the lack of professionalism among Singaporean workers. Most of the workers completes work on time during evenings and their mentality of staying beyond that time would be like doing as a favour. He hopes to use the movie to highlight the bureaucracy inefficiencies in office.

Originally Neo was not planning to act in the film. He would play the part of the doctor because of the original actor's unavailability.

Filming 
This film began shooting in high-definition video format starting on 1 February 2006 and ending in March 2006.

Release 
It had a strong opening during Chinese New Year, earning $421,000 from 35 prints for second place in the chart.

Reception 
At the Golden Horse Awards 2007, Just Follow Law was nominated for Best Original Screenplay and Best Visual Effects, while Gurmit Singh was one of four considered for Best Actor.

References

External links 
 
 Official Just Follow Law Website
 A review of Just Follow Law

2007 films
Hokkien-language films
Singaporean comedy films
Body swapping in films
2000s English-language films